The 1960 European Nations' Cup was the inaugural tournament of the UEFA European Championship, held every four years and organised by UEFA. The first tournament was held in France. It was won by the Soviet Union, who beat Yugoslavia 2–1 in Paris after extra time.

The tournament was a knockout competition; just 17 teams entered with some notable absences, West Germany, Italy and England among those missing. The teams would play home-and-away matches until the semi-finals; the final four teams would then move on to the final tournament, whose host was selected after the teams became known.

In the quarter-finals, Spain, who were under Francoist rule, refused to travel to the Soviet Union for political reasons. After a proposal to play the tie over one leg at a neutral venue were rejected by the Soviets, Spain were disqualified: accordingly, three of the final four teams were from communist countries: the USSR, Czechoslovakia, and SFR Yugoslavia, to go with hosts France.

In the semi-finals, the Soviets made easy work of the Czechoslovaks in Marseille, beating them 3–0. The other match saw a nine-goal thriller as Yugoslavia came on top 5–4 after coming back from a two-goal deficit twice. Czechoslovakia beat the demoralised French 2–0 for third place.

In the final, Yugoslavia scored first, but the Soviet Union, led by legendary goalkeeper Lev Yashin, equalised in the 49th minute. After 90 minutes the score was 1–1, and Viktor Ponedelnik scored with seven minutes left in extra time to give the Soviets the inaugural European Championship.

Qualification

Qualified teams

Venues

Squads

Match officials

Final tournament

In all matches but the final, extra time and a coin toss were used to decide the winner if necessary. If the final remained level after extra time, a replay would be used to determine the winner.

All times are local, CET (UTC+1).

Bracket

Semi-finals

Third place play-off

Final

Statistics

Goalscorers

Awards
UEFA Team of the Tournament

References

External links

1960 European Nations' Cup at UEFA.com

 
1960
1959–60 in European football
1959–60 in French football
1960
July 1960 sports events in Europe